Ian MacKenzie (born September 30, 1953) is a former competition swimmer who represented Canada at the 1972 Summer Olympics in Munich, Germany.  MacKenzie was a member of Canada's team in the 4x200-metre freestyle relay which placed 7th in the event final.  He also competed in the 100 and 200-metre backstroke events, advancing the semifinals of the 100-metre.

See also
 List of Commonwealth Games medallists in swimming (men)

References

1953 births
Living people
Swimmers from Vancouver
Canadian male backstroke swimmers
Canadian male freestyle swimmers
Olympic swimmers of Canada
Swimmers at the 1971 Pan American Games
Swimmers at the 1972 Summer Olympics
Swimmers at the 1974 British Commonwealth Games
World Aquatics Championships medalists in swimming
Pan American Games silver medalists for Canada
Commonwealth Games medallists in swimming
Commonwealth Games gold medallists for Canada
Commonwealth Games bronze medallists for Canada
Pan American Games medalists in swimming
Medalists at the 1971 Pan American Games
Medallists at the 1974 British Commonwealth Games